The stripe-chested antwren (Myrmotherula longicauda) is a species of bird in the family Thamnophilidae found in Bolivia, Ecuador, and Peru and southwestern Colombia. Its natural habitats are subtropical or tropical moist lowland forests, subtropical or tropical moist montane forests, and heavily degraded former forest.

Description
The male has a black head and black upper parts boldly streaked with white. The black wings have two white wing bands and white edges to the flight feathers. The tail feathers are black with white edges and a broad white tip. The throat and lower underparts are white, and the breast and flanks are white streaked with black. The female has the crown of the head and the back black streaked with dark buff. The remaining upper parts and the tail are similar to those of the male, but the throat and breast are creamy-ochre, with a clear demarcation between this region and the lower underparts, which are white.

Distribution
Its range extends from eastern Colombia through Ecuador and Peru to northern Bolivia.

Ecology
The species is found singly or in pairs, but not in larger groups. It hops on the ground and flits about in the lowest few metres of undergrowth at the edges of forests, in clearings, or among vines near streams. The diet includes insects and spiders. Little is known of its breeding habits.

Conservation status
Myrmotherula longicauda is a fairly common species and the International Union for Conservation of Nature has assessed its conservation status as being of "least concern", believing that any possible decline in the bird's total population is not sufficiently rapid to place it in a more threatened category.

References

stripe-chested antwren
Birds of the Bolivian Andes
Birds of the Ecuadorian Andes
Birds of the Peruvian Andes
stripe-chested antwren
stripe-chested antwren
Taxonomy articles created by Polbot